"Peace & Quiet" was the first official release from the British indie rock band The Rifles. It was released only on 7" by Blow Up Records and was limited to only 1000 copies. Upon hearing a demo of "Peace & Quiet" in late 2004, BBC Radio 1 host Zane Lowe immediately invited The Rifles to the Radio 1 studios to record a session, which aired in December of that year.

The song was then re-recorded and released later by Red Ink as the fifth and final single, from their debut record No Love Lost. The single was released in October 2006 and peaked at number 48 on the UK Singles Chart.

"Peace & Quiet" also featured in the episode "Return to Sender" of the TV series FM.

Track listing

Blow Up Records release

Red Ink (re-issue)

References

2005 singles
2006 singles
The Rifles (band) songs
Song recordings produced by Ian Broudie
2005 songs